Isaac Meyer Held (born 1948) is an American meteorologist. He is a senior research scientist at the Geophysical Fluid Dynamics Laboratory. Held was elected to the United States National Academy of Sciences in 2003.

Biography
Born to refugee parents in Ulm, Germany in 1948, Held came to Minnesota with his family at the age of 4. His father died when he was only eight and he and his brother were raised by his mother Bertha, a Holocaust survivor who worked as a seamstress. Held did his undergraduate work in physics at the University of Minnesota, Minneapolis in 1969 and started a graduate program in theoretical physics at the State University of New York at Stony Brook. While there, he discovered climate science which led to his transferring to the Atmospheric and Oceanic Sciences Program at Princeton University, where he completed his Ph.D. in 1976 under the supervision of Syukuro Manabe. After a brief stint as a postdoctoral fellow at Harvard University, Held returned to Princeton to join the Geophysical Fluid Dynamics Laboratory in 1978. He is currently a senior research scientist at the laboratory and teaches in the Atmospheric and Oceanic Sciences Program at Princeton University.

Research
Held's research has had two major themes. The first is understanding how the earth's climate responds to changes in the amount of solar radiation hitting the planet or to the concentration of greenhouse gasses in the atmosphere. His early work highlighted the importance of the lapse rate in determining the climate's response to radiation changes. Held has continued to be concerned with how global warming can alter both the cycle of water and the distribution of winds on earth. In a paper published in 2006 with Brian Soden, he showed that this increase in precipitation might nonetheless be associated with a slowdown of the Walker circulation.

The second theme of Held's research is the general circulation of the atmosphere. In one of his earliest papers, he showed that when a region is unstable to the large-scale planetary waves known as Rossby waves, the propagation of waves out of this region results in an easterly (westward) acceleration, which generates jet streams in midlatitudes. In contrast, regions in which these waves break experience an eastward (westerly) acceleration. Held also developed a theory for the Hadley circulation that would exist in the absence of atmospheric turbulence.

Awards and honors

1987: Clarence Leroy Meisinger Award, American Meteorological Society
1991: Fellow, American Meteorological Society
1995: Fellow, American Geophysical Union
2003: Elected to the United States National Academy of Sciences
2008: Carl-Gustaf Rossby Research Medal, American Meteorological Society
2011: BBVA Foundation Frontiers of Knowledge Award of Climate Change for his fundamental and pioneering contributions to our understanding of the structure of atmospheric circulation systems, and the role of water vapor – the most important greenhouse gas – in Climate Change.
2018: Roger Revelle Medal, American Geophysical Union

See also
 Held-Hou Model

References

External links
 Isaac Held's Homepage at the Geophysical Fluid Dynamics Laboratory.
 Isaac Held's bibliography at the Geophysical Fluid Dynamics Laboratory.
 Isaac Held's blog at the Geophysical Fluid Dynamics Laboratory.

University of Minnesota College of Science and Engineering alumni
American meteorologists
American people of German-Jewish descent
Intergovernmental Panel on Climate Change lead authors
National Oceanic and Atmospheric Administration personnel
Living people
Members of the United States National Academy of Sciences
Fellows of the American Geophysical Union
1948 births